State Route 326 (SR 326), also known as Gallaher Road, is a short  state highway in Roane County, Tennessee. It connects U.S. Route 70 (US 70) with Interstate 40 (I-40) and, via SR 58, the city of Oak Ridge.

Route description

SR 326 begins at an intersection with US 70/SR 1 east of downtown Kingston. The highway then comes to an interchange with I-40 and SR 58 at the Kingston city limits (exit 356), where SR 326 ends and Gallaher Road continues north towards Oak Ridge as SR 58.

Major intersections

References

326
Transportation in Roane County, Tennessee